Todd Douglas Self (born November 9, 1978) is a former Major League Baseball first baseman/outfielder. He is 6'5 and weighs 225 pounds.

In , he played for the Houston Astros' Double-A affiliate, the Corpus Christi Hooks. He became a free agent at the end of the season. In , he played for the independent St. Paul Saints.

External links

1978 births
Living people
Houston Astros players
Baseball players from Shreveport, Louisiana
Major League Baseball outfielders
Auburn Doubledays players
Pittsfield Astros players
Michigan Battle Cats players
Salem Avalanche players
Round Rock Express players
Trenton Thunder players
Norfolk Tides players
Corpus Christi Hooks players
St. Paul Saints players
Shreveport Sports players